Erik Berg may refer to:

Erik Berg (politician) (1876–1945), Finnish politician
Erik Berg (Swedish politician), chairperson of Liberal Youth of Sweden since 2022
Eric Berg (1945–2020), American sculptor
Erik Berg (footballer) (né  Erik Johansson, born 1988), Swedish footballer